Jonas Suyderhoef (1613 in Haarlem – 1686 in Haarlem), was a Dutch Golden Age engraver.

Biography
According to the RKD he was known as a draughtsman and printmaker.
He was a nephew of Kenau Simonsdochter Hasselaer and the son of Andries Suyderhoef, who was secretary to Cornelius Haga.

References

Jonas Suyderhoef on Artnet

External links

1613 births
1686 deaths
Dutch Golden Age printmakers
Dutch engravers
Artists from Haarlem
Painters from Haarlem